Allegheny was an unincorporated community and coal town in Pike County, Kentucky, United States.  The coal works are no longer active and the site of the former community is now a ghost town.

References

Unincorporated communities in Pike County, Kentucky
Unincorporated communities in Kentucky
Coal towns in Kentucky